A Tear and a Smile is the second album by Irish band Tír na nÓg. It was released in the United Kingdom on 7 April 1972 by Chrysalis Records and was the first Tír na nÓg album to be released in the United States, in October 1972. The track list is different between the US and the UK releases. Because of this, two editions of the album exist but there was no reissue of the North American version.
On this last one, "Daisy Lady" and "Dante" are taken directly from the first album Tír na nÓg. The song "Looking Up" was already on the previous album but Leo O'Kelly was not very satisfied by the first version: he and Sonny Condell decided to record a new one, produced by Tony Cox, for A Tear and a Smile. The Lady I Love which was released as a single in Europe, appears also on the US version of the album, these four songs replacing "Down Day", "Bluebottle Stew", "Hemisphere", and "Goodbye My Love".

Track listing

1972 UK edition

1972 North America edition

Personnel
Sonny Condell – vocals, guitar, clavinette, percussion
Leo O'Kelly – vocals, guitar
Larry Steele – bass
Barry De Souza – drums
Paul Tregurtha – engineering
Nick Harrison – arranger
Tony Cox – production
Bill Leader – production

Release history

References

Tír na nÓg (band) albums
1972 albums
Chrysalis Records albums